DTU may refer to:

 Technical University of Denmark (abbreviated as DTU)
 German Taekwondo Union (abbreviated as DTU)
 Wudalianchi Dedu Airport in Northeast China, IATA code DTU
 Database Throughput Unit, see Microsoft Azure SQL Database
 Delhi Technological University
 Dominica Trade Union
 Data Transport Utility (I/Gear)
 German Dance and Entertainment Orchestra
 Duy Tan University
 Dota Tuesday's United